Johan is a Dutch band fronted by singer/guitarist Jacco de Greeuw. Their music has been primarily influenced by bands such as The Beatles, Crowded House, and The Byrds.

Biography
Jacco de Greeuw founded Thank God For Us in the late eighties, after having played in several other bands. The band was renamed Little Mary Big when joined by Marike Groot. With this band, he reached second place at the Grote Prijs van Nederland, an important music competition in the Netherlands. However, arguments with female vocalist Marike Groot (who later appeared on Always..., the debut album of The Gathering), forced them to break up the band. De Greeuw formed a new band named Visions of Johanna after a Bob Dylan song. In 1992 they competed once again in the Grote Prijs competition, reaching the semi-finals this time.

After some changes in the line-up, the band signed a contract with Excelsior Recordings in 1995 and released a single ("Swing"). One year later, in 1996, the band's name was shortened to Johan. Under this name the band released a self-titled debut album. The album was received well by Dutch critics and became a commercial success.

SpinART Records signed the band for the US region. When legendary record executive Seymour Stein heard the band's music he became interested, and travelled to the Netherlands to see the band play. Impressed, he licensed the record from SpinART to release it on Sire Records. Subsequently, the band toured Stateside with Sloan, but then all went awry. For inexplicable reasons Sire pulled out of the deal and failed to give the album a proper release.

The band planned to record its second release in 1998, but De Greeuw's clinical depression took its toll. Three more years would pass before Pergola was released, in 2001. The album received rave reviews and got a lot of airplay on national radio stations. That summer Johan featured on the Pinkpop festival. The following year the band even received the Dutch Edison award for Best National Pop Group.

After an international tour, hardly any news was heard from Johan until 2004, when members Wim Kwakman and Diederik Nomdem left the band. Jeroen Kleijn stepped up and became the band's new drummer, and Diets Dijkstra became the band's bassist. After this Johan started playing live again, and recorded its third album, THX JHN, which was released in May 2006.

The first single of the album, "Oceans", became a great success. This was helped by the song's video, in which an actual fan from Argentina travels from her home country to the Netherlands to see Johan play live. The fact that we see a real fan documenting her trip gives the video something special. The theme of fans thanking Johan (THX is short for ‘thanks’) is also applied to the album's booklet, where various fans from other countries appear. The video's original concept and the question of the authenticity of the clip's footage made for a serious online buzz. The single stayed in the Dutch charts for more than 25 consecutive weeks. 

Johan played a sold-out club tour and released two more successful singles, "Walking Away" and "She's Got A Way With Men". Through a deal with V2 Records the album was also released in Germany and Italy. Although the album deal for the debut with Sire fell through in the '90s, the band still has a steady following in the US.

The fourth album, titled 4, was scheduled to be released on 22 December 2008, but was eventually released on 30 April 2009, breaking with the tradition of a new record every five years.

On 26 August 2009 Johan announced they were disbanding at the end of 2009. On 22 December they played their last show, at Paradiso in Amsterdam. At this show they received a gold record for Pergola. A DVD of their last show was to be released at the end of 2010, but this has not happened to date.

On 11 January 2018 it was announced on the band's website that a new album would appear on 13 April 2018 and some concert dates were announced.

Line-up

Current members
Jacco de Greeuw: lead singer, guitar (1996–2009, 2018–present)
Diets Dijkstra: guitar (1999), bass, backing vocals (1999–2009, 2018–present)
Jeroen Kleijn: drums (2004–2009, 2018–present)
Robin Berlijn: guitar (2018–present)

Live members
Matthijs van Duijvenbode: keyboard (2007–2009)
Jan Teertstra: keyboard, backing vocals (2018–present)

Former members
Remco Krull: guitar (1996–1998)
Niels de Wit: bass (1996–1998)
Wim Kwakman: drums (1996–2004)
David Corel: bass, backing vocals (1999–2001)
Diederik Nomden: guitar, keyboard (1999–2004)
Maarten Kooijman: guitar, backing vocals (2000–2009)

Discography

Singles
 "Swing" – Excelsior Recordings – 25 November 1996
 "Everybody knows" – Excelsior Recordings – 17 March 1997
 "December" – Excelsior Recordings – 4 August 1997
 "Pergola" – Excelsior Recordings – 26 March 2001
 "Tumble and fall" – Excelsior Recordings – 25 June 2001
 "Day is done" – Excelsior Recordings – 5 May 2001
 "Oceans" – Excelsior Recordings – 22 May 2006
 "Walking away" – Excelsior Recordings – 17 August 2006
 "She's Got A Way With Men" – Excelsior Recordings – 20 November 2006
 "About Time" – Excelsior Recordings – 22 February 2018

Albums
 Johan – Excelsior Recordings – 4 November 1996
 Pergola – Excelsior Recordings – 23 April 2001
 THX JHN – Excelsior Recordings – 22 May 2006
 4 – Excelsior Recordings – 4 May 2009
 Pull Up – Excelsior Recordings – 13 April 2018

External links

Official website of the band
Johan on Excelsior Recordings
Free video of entire Amsterdam show on Fabchannel.com

References

Musical groups from North Holland
Dutch alternative rock groups